Flaite is a Chilean Spanish slang used to define urban youth of aggressive attitude who are linked to vulgar habits and crime. The stereotype of the flaite is from a low socioeconomic background, can be a delinquent, travel in groups, and like chavs, have a distinct style of dress. They enjoy (vacilan) music such as cumbia and reggaeton.

The flaite stereotype wear sneakers such as Nike Dunks and other basketball or soccer shoes. They usually have short haircuts (called "sopaipilla", because it looks like that fried pastry) accompanied by jockey caps. They enjoy wearing flashy accessories, known as bling-bling, as well as tightly worn jeans. Some youth from middle to upper socioeconomic backgrounds follow the fashion style of the flaites by wearing baggy jeans, which is believed by some to be evolving into a subcultural group.

See also 
Apaçi (Turkey)
Lad (Australia and New Zealand)
Chav (UK)
Negro (Argentina)
Dres (Poland)
Gopnik (Russia)
Maloqueiro (Brazil)
Low culture

References

Age-related stereotypes
Chilean youth culture
Class-related slurs
Spanish slang
Stereotypes of the working class
Stereotypes of urban people
Social class in Latin America